John William Livock (30 July 1814 - 15 March 1883) was an architect based in England, best known for his railway stations constructed for the London and North Western Railway.

Family

He was born on 30 July 1814 in Hampstead, the son of John Livock (1781-1840) a Coal Merchant, and Mary Millican (1792-1865). He was baptised on 25 September 1814 in St John's Church, Hampstead. He married Julia Barker (1823-1867) and they had two children
John Edward Livock (1848-1858)
Mary Livock (1850-1914)

He died on 15 March 1883 in London.

Career

He constructed many of the stations on the Blisworth to Peterborough railway line which was built by the London and North Western Railway, and the Trent Valley Line and the southern part of the North Staffordshire Railway.

List of works

Gallery

References

19th-century English architects
1815 births
1883 deaths
People from Hampstead
British railway architects
Architects from London
London and North Western Railway people